Chrysoperla lucasina is a species of neuropteran of the family Chrysopidae (subfamily Chrysopinae). They are found mainly in the United Kingdom, the Czech Republic, France, Germany, Greece, Italy, Spain, Portugal, Switzerland, in western Asia and northern Africa.

C. lucasina can be distinguished from other members of the carnea-group of the genus Chrysoperla by subtle and variable morphological attributes.

Adults can be encountered from late Spring through mid-Autumn. They are polyphagous, feeding on pollen and nectar of various herbaceous flowering plants (mainly Brassicaceae, Graminaceae, Apiaceae, and Asteraceae), as well as on honeydew, their preferred diet in Autumn.

After the feeding period, they fly near colonies of aphids, where they breed and the females lay eggs. Unlike the adults, the larvae are fearsome predators; consequently, these insects are used for the biological pest control of aphids and other small arthropods. The adult insects hibernate in winter.

References
 Colin L. Plant (1994) – Lacewings
 Henry et al. Chrysoperla lucasina (Lacroix): a distinct species of green lacewing, confirmed by acoustical analysis (Neuroptera: Chrysopidae) – Systematic Entomology, 1996 –  (PDF)
 Villenave et al. – The pollens consumed by Chrysoperla lucasina and Ch. affinis (Neuroptera: Chrysopidae) in cabbage crop environment in western of France – European Journal of Entomology
 Villenave et al. – Pollen preference of the Chrysoperla species (Neuroptera: Chrysopidae) occurring in the crop environment in western France – European Journal of Entomology

External links
 

Chrysopidae
Insects described in 1912
Neuroptera of Europe